Niesulow may refer to the following places in Poland:
Niesulów, Łódź Voivodeship (central Poland)
Niesułów, West Pomeranian Voivodeship (north-west Poland)